Mankon is a Grassfields language spoken in Cameroon. It is closely related to Mundum and Mendankwe-Nkwen. Along with Mundum, it is called Ngemba. There are several distinct dialects: Mankunge (Ngemba), Nsongwa (Songwa, Bangwa), Shomba (Chomba, Bamechom), Mbutu (Bambutu), Njong (Banjong), Bagangu (Akum) and Alatening.

Culture

References

External links 
 Description of Mankon marriage procedure archived with Kaipuleohone

Ngemba languages
Languages of Cameroon